Ptilothyris aglaocrossa is a moth in the family Lecithoceridae. It was described by Edward Meyrick in 1935. It is found in the Democratic Republic of the Congo (Katanga).

References

Moths described in 1935
Ptilothyris
Taxa named by Edward Meyrick
Endemic fauna of the Democratic Republic of the Congo